Stanley Burgess (born 1889, Ipswich, died 2 June 1972) was a British trade unionist and Labour Party politician, sitting as MP for Rochdale 1922–23.

Politics
At 17 Burgess spoke at Independent Labour Party meetings then moved to the US where he joined Bill Haywood in Pittsburg in 1911 in a mining dispute. He was arrested under the Defence of the Realm Act 1914 for his part in leading a strike of Sheffield engineers in May 1917.

At the 1918 general election, Burgess stood unsuccessfully in the  Leith constituency in Scotland.  He was elected at the 1922 general election as Member of Parliament for Rochdale in Lancashire, but was defeated at the 1923 election. He did not stand for Parliament again, and returned to his role as a leading official of the Amalgamated Engineering Union.

Early life and personal life
Burgess was born in Ipswich in 1889 to Richard John Burgess and left school at 13. In 1914 he married Ida, the daughter of Thomas Nicholson from Holmesfield, Derbyshire.

References

External links 
 
 Stanley Burgess at the National Portrait Gallery, London

1889 births
Year of death missing
Amalgamated Engineering Union-sponsored MPs
Labour Party (UK) MPs for English constituencies
UK MPs 1922–1923
Members of the Parliament of the United Kingdom for Rochdale
Politicians from Ipswich
English trade unionists